Gaasbeek is a village in the Belgian municipality of Lennik in Flemish Brabant. It is most known for Gaasbeek Castle, which is now a national museum.

In 2007 it was chosen as one of the 15 most beautiful villages in Flanders.

References

Populated places in Flemish Brabant